The 1972 football season was São Paulo's 43rd season since club's existence.

Statistics

Scorers

Overall

{|class="wikitable"
|-
|Games played || 71 (10 Copa Libertadores, 22 Campeonato Paulista, 28 Campeonato Brasileiro, 11 Friendly match)
|-
|Games won || 37 (4 Copa Libertadores, 14 Campeonato Paulista, 13 Campeonato Brasileiro, 6 Friendly match)
|-
|Games drawn || 21 (4 Copa Libertadores, 8 Campeonato Paulista, 6 Campeonato Brasileiro, 3 Friendly match)
|-
|Games lost || 13 (2 Copa Libertadores, 0 Campeonato Paulista, 9 Campeonato Brasileiro, 2 Friendly match)
|-
|Goals scored || 116
|-
|Goals conceded || 56
|-
|Goal difference || +60
|-
|Best result || 6–0 (A) v Náutico - Campeonato Brasileiro - 1972.11.06
|-
|Worst result || 0–4 (A) v Coritiba - Campeonato Brasileiro - 1972.10.15
|-
|Most appearances || Gilberto Sorriso (68)
|-
|Top scorer || Toninho Guerreiro (28)
|-

Friendlies

Torneio Laudo Natel

Official competitions

Copa Libertadores

Record

Campeonato Paulista

Record

Campeonato Brasileiro

Record

External links
official website 

Association football clubs 1972 season
1972
1972 in Brazilian football